Denguin is a commune in the Pyrénées-Atlantiques department, southwestern France. It is located 14 km from Pau, Pyrenees-Atlantiques, the prefecture of the Department.

See also
Communes of the Pyrénées-Atlantiques department

References

Communes of Pyrénées-Atlantiques